Kyra Taylor Carusa (born 14 November 1995) is a footballer who plays as a forward for FA Women's Championship club London City Lionesses. Born in the United States, she is a member of the Republic of Ireland women's national team.

College career
During the National Women's Soccer League draft in 2019, Carusa was selected by Sky Blue FC. She was the 19th draft pick overall. While playing with the Georgetown University Hoyas for one season, Carusa had scored 10 goals during the season and made 12 assists as a forward.

Club career
In April 2019, she joined French club Le Havre AC. She played three matches, scoring four goals for the club, until she signed a new contract with the Danish club HB Køge in Kvinde 1. division, in February 2020. In February 2023, Carusa joined English club London City Lionesses.

International career
She made her debut for the Republic of Ireland women's national football team in February 2020, at the UEFA Women's Euro 2021 qualifying, after receiving Irish citizenship. Carusa is eligible to play for the Republic of Ireland through her Irish grandparents.

International goals

References

External links
 
 
 
 
 
 Kyra Carusa at Football Association of Ireland (FAI)

1995 births
Living people
Soccer players from San Diego
American people of Irish descent
Republic of Ireland women's association footballers
American women's soccer players
Women's association football forwards
Stanford Cardinal women's soccer players
Georgetown Hoyas women's soccer players
Le Havre AC (women) players
HB Køge (women) players
London City Lionesses players
Republic of Ireland women's international footballers
Republic of Ireland expatriate association footballers
Irish expatriate sportspeople in France
Irish expatriate sportspeople in Denmark
American expatriate women's soccer players
American expatriate sportspeople in France
American expatriate sportspeople in Denmark
Expatriate women's footballers in France
Expatriate women's footballers in Denmark